A phone booth or telephone booth is a small structure furnished with a payphone and designed for a telephone user's convenience.

Phone Booth may also refer to:

Phone Booth (film), a 2002 American suspense-thriller film
"Phone Booth" (song), a 2005 single by Teairra Marí
Telephone Booth (song)", a 1989 song by Ian Moss
The "Phone Booth", nickname of the Verizon Center in Washington, D.C., USA
The "Phone Booth", nickname of AT&T Park in San Francisco, California, USA